Into the Arena is a live compilation album by American heavy metal band Omen. It was released digitally on December 20, 2011 by DSN Music and on CD on May 15, 2012 by No Remorse Records. It is an official and extended re-release of Into the Arena: 20 Years Live, an unofficial 2008 release by KRP studios.

The CD release is a limited edition of 500 hand-numbered copies, with 16-page booklet including lyrics, many unreleased photos, and liner notes from Kenny Powell.

2012 track listing

Tracks 1–6 were recorded live at the Cameo Theater, San Antonio, Texas in 1985
Tracks 7–10 are demo versions from Warning of Danger recordings
Tracks 11 and 12 came from Kenny Powell's personal archives
Track 13 was recorded on 2000 and is previously unreleased

2008 track listing

Track 7 is not included in the 2012 release

Personnel
Omen
 J.D. Kimball – vocals on tracks 2–10
 Kenny Powell – guitars
 Steve Wittig – drums on tracks 1–12
 Jody Henry – bass on tracks 1–12
 Matt Story – vocals on track 13
 Andy Haas – bass on track 13
 Rick Murray – drums on track 13

Production
 Kenny Powell – production
 Matt Storey – cover art

References

Omen (band) albums
2012 live albums